Harper Valley PTA (known simply as Harper Valley during its second season) is an American sitcom television series based on the 1978 film of the same name, which was itself based on the 1968 country song of the same name recorded by singer Jeannie C. Riley and written by Tom T. Hall. The series, starring Barbara Eden who reprised her role from the film, aired on NBC from January 16, 1981 to August 14, 1982.

Synopsis
The series went on to flesh out the story in the song, as it told of the adventures of Stella Johnson (Barbara Eden), a widowed single mother to teenager Dee (Jenn Thompson), who lived in the fictional town of Harper Valley, Ohio.

The town was dominated by the namesakes of the founder, the Harper family, most prominently represented by the mayor, Otis Harper, Jr (George Gobel).

Mrs. Johnson's flouting of the small town's conventions, and exposure of the hypocrisy of many of its other notorious residents provided the humour.

Her most notable foes were the wealthy and completely snobbish Reilly family, which consisted of the snobby head of the family, Flora (Anne Francine); her snotty daughter, Wanda (Bridget Hanley); her husband, Bobby, (Rod McCary) and their daughter, Scarlett (Suzi Dean). The stuck-up Scarlett was mainly Dee's nemesis, just as her mother and grandmother were Stella's arch-enemies.

In the show's early episodes, Mrs. Johnson had been recently elected to the board of directors of the PTA and this was the source of most of the show's plots (two of the other members were Vivian Washburn (Mari Gorman) and Willamae Jones (Edie McClurg)); later it was decided that this idea had been carried about as far as was practical and the PTA aspect was dropped from the show, which was then retitled Harper Valley.

During this phase, Stella's relationship with Dee was more prominent and actor Mills Watson joined the cast as Stella's eccentric uncle, Winslow Homer Smith.  Nicknamed Buster, he was an inventor whose inventions never worked the way they were supposed to.

Stella still did battle with the Reilly clan on occasion. Her best friend was Cassie Bowman, a reporter for the town's paper (Fannie Flagg).

At various times, Stella had to deal with her evil twin, Della Smith (played by Barbara Eden wearing a black wig), much as she had when she was on her more famous series, I Dream of Jeannie, when she played her evil twin sister, Jeannie II.

The show ran from January 1981 to August 1982 on NBC; it was later released into syndication to local stations briefly in the mid-1980s, even though there were too few episodes made for it to be normally syndicated. Cable television network TV Land showed reruns of the show in 2000.

Broadcast history

Episodes

Season 1 (1981)

Season 2 (1981–82)

External links
 
 

1981 American television series debuts
1982 American television series endings
1980s American sitcoms
English-language television shows
NBC original programming
Live action television shows based on films
Television series based on adaptations
Television series by Universal Television
Television series created by Sherwood Schwartz
Television shows set in Ohio